Driskell is a surname. Notable people with the surname include:

David Driskell (1931–2020), American artist
Gretchen Driskell (born 1958), American politician
James Driskell (born 1959), Canadian man wrongly convicted of murder
John Driskell Hopkins (born 1971), American singer, musician, songwriter